Ghazaliya (Arabic: الغزالية) is a neighborhood in the western outskirts of Baghdad, Iraq, in the city's Mansour district. To the north of Ghazaliya is the neighborhood of Al-Shu'ala, to the east is Al-Adel, to the south is Al Khadhraa, and to the west is Abu Ghraib. It is a working-class neighborhood of about 100,000 residents. Ghazaliya is situated around six major streets that all end at farms that formerly belonged to Uday Hussein, the son of Saddam Hussein.

Etymology
It is believed to be named after the name of woman she was with her sister the owners of the land her name was Ghazaliya she was owning half of the land. Her sister named Junyina and she was owning the other half of the land. Till 1990's the name of the city was Ghazaliya and Junyina. Then became Ghazaliya name called on both lands.

History

Ghazaliya was built in the Mid-1980s and was home for many military officers during Saddam Hussein's rule. It was a middle to high class area of mainly Sunni Muslims with some Shia, Christians and others. Saddam hid here during the first Gulf War. That place where Saddam had hidden was turned into the largest mosque in Baghdad which was named Um Al-Maarik mosque. After the U.S. invasion of Iraq in 2003 the Shia named it Um Al-Baneen for about 7 months then the Sunnis took back the control of the mosque and named it جامع أم القرى
Umm_al-Qura_Mosque. .

When Sunni–Shia conflict flared in Iraq following the February 2006 al-Askari Mosque bombing in Samarra, Shia militias pushed into Ghazaliya from neighboring Al-Shu'ala. Sunnis turned to Al-Qaeda in Iraq and Shia families fled. Ghazaliya's mixed community split into a Sunni southern section and a Shia northern section. The US Army built concrete walls to segregate the two communities and to create a secure perimeter.

References

Ghazaliya
1980s establishments in Iraq